Marie Majoie Hajary (Paramaribo, 16 August 1921 – Neuilly-sur-Seine, 25 August 2017) was a Dutch-French composer and pianist of contemporary classical music and jazz. She was also a translator and wrote several books for pianists.

Life 
Majoie Hajary (sometimes spelled Majoye Hajary) was born in South America in 1921 in Paramaribo, Suriname as the eldest of three daughters in a wealthy family. Her father Harry Najaralie Hajary (1892 – 1959) was a prominent official of the then-Dutch colony and was Hindustani. Her mother Wilhelmina Tjong-Ayong (1896 – 1976) was of Creole and Chinese descent. Majoie received musical training from the nuns of a monastery in Gravenstraat, followed by an eight-year secondary education at the Hendrikschool.

In 1937, at the age of 16, Hajary went to study at the Amsterdam Conservatory where she studied piano with Nelly Wagenaar and composition with Hendrik Andriessen. In 1941, Margot Vos' booklet Sun Rays was published, for which Hajary composed the music and drew the illustrations. She graduated with honors as a performing pianist in June 1942. In 1943 she won the Conservatory's first prize for her composition Hindoustani Fantaisie, which was performed by the Concertgebouw Orchestra.

In the mid-1940s, Hajary gave Dutch Kultuurkamer concerts throughout the Netherlands and went on tour through Germany and Austria. In 1947 she moved to Caracas, Venezuela and gave concerts in Central and South America. She also regularly visited her native country of Suriname. In 1949 she moved to Paris to study composition with Louis Aubert and Nadia Boulanger.

In 1951, at Notre Dame cathedral in Paris, Hajary married Roland Garros (1924 – 1983), nephew of the famous French aviation pioneer Roland Garros. The couple had two children and moved often because Roland worked as the director of several foreign offices of Air France. They lived in Madagascar, Lambaréné, Tokyo, New Delhi and Istanbul. In many places, Hajary arranged to perform concerts and teach students.

Hajary developed as a composer of world music with Indian influences and was sometimes called the "Hindu pianist." She started transcribing ragas and then went on to write them herself. Examples are New Sound From India (1967), Requiem pour Mahatma Gandhi (1968) and Chants du Gita Govinda (1974). In the 1960s she composed Da Pinawiki, an oratorio about the Passion of Christ. The text was based on her grandmother's Surinamese Bible and the oratorio was opened in Easter week from 1974 performed in several large churches of Paramaribo.

In addition to her performances, Hajary was also a writer and translated the work of others. She provided Max Havelaar's first translation into French. 

On 25 August 2017, Hajary passed away at home at the age of 96, and she was buried in the Old Cemetery of Neuilly-sur-Seine near Paris.

Primary compositions 
 Concerto for piano and orchestra: Hindoustani fantaisie (premiered at the Concertgebouw in Amsterdam), Broekmans & Van Poppel, 1943  
 Indoue Ballet (Washington, performed by Lilavati Yaquilar), 1946  
 Lieder (in German) text by Helle Von Heister, Unesco Paris, 1950  
 Quartet: Jade Flute, 1954  
 Play Koto (Tokyo), 1965  
 New Sound From India (CBS), 1967  
 Requiem For Mahatma Gandhi (CBS), 1968  
 The Passion According to Judas (CBS), 1970  
 Chants du Gita Govinda (Chants du monde) text by Marguerite Yourcenar read by Maurice Béjart, 1974  
 Da Pinawieke - oratorio sung every year at Easter in Paramaribo, 1975  
 Variations 87X1, 1976  
 Blue Râga for piano and orchestra, 1977  
 La Larme d'Or - opera in one prologue and three acts, 1996  
 Râga du Prince - “il ritratto dell'amore” performed by Egon Mihajlovic and Jeremias Schwarzer, (Cybele), 1999

Publications 
 Le Yoga du Pianiste, Paris 1987, reissued in 1991 (Sedim editor) and translated into Dutch (Strengholt-Naarden, La Haye, 1989)
 The Art of the Piano, a method within everyone's reach, Paris, 1989 (Choudens editor, ID Musique)
 La forme du Râga, Paris, 1991

Translations 
Hajary translated from Dutch to French.
 Planning by Professor Jan Tinbergen, Nobel Prize winner (Univers de la knowledge-Hachette - Paris, 1967)
 Max Havelaar de Multatuli (Edouard Douves Dekker) first translation in France (the previous versions being Belgian) (University editions - Paris, 1968)
 Telemachus in the village of Marnix Gijsen (university editions - Paris, 1969)
 Plants of the world by H. De Witt (Hachette, 3 volumes, Paris, 1966 - 1968 - 1969)
 Endangered peoples and customs: Black Africa by G. Pubben and C. Gloudemans (Grund-Paris, 1979)

References 

   

1921 births
2017 deaths
Conservatorium van Amsterdam alumni
Dutch women classical composers
20th-century classical composers
20th-century women composers
21st-century women composers
Women classical composers
Surinamese emigrants to the Netherlands
Dutch expatriates in Venezuela
Dutch expatriates in France